Aemilius is a synonym for the Gymnetis genus of beetle.

Aemilius may also refer to:

People
Aemilia gens, gens in ancient Rome Includes list of Ancient Romans named Aemilius
 The Latin form of the given name Emil

Non-Romans
Aemilius Irving (1823-1913), Canadian lawyer and politician
Aemilius Jarvis (1860-1940), Canadian businessman and sailor
Aemilius Ludwig Richter (1808-1864), German jurist
Gonzalo Aemilius (born 1979), Uruguayan cleric, secretary to Pope Francis
 Paulus Aemilius Veronensis (c. 1455 – 1529), Italian historian
 Paulus Aemilius (Hebrew scholar) (c. 1510 – 1575), Bavarian Hebrew teacher and bibliographer

Structures
 Pons Aemilius, an ancient Roman bridge

See also